The 2009 Atlantic Sun men's basketball tournament took place from March 4–7, 2009 at Allen Arena in Nashville, Tennessee.

Format
The seven eligible men's basketball teams in the Atlantic Sun Conference receive a berth in the conference tournament.  After the 20 game conference season, teams are seeded by conference record.  The winner of the tournament receives an automatic bid to the NCAA tournament.  The #1 seed, if not tournament champions, will receive an automatic bid to the NIT.

Bracket

Sources
Atlantic Sun Basketball Championship

Tournament
Atlantic Sun men's basketball tournament
Atlantic Sun men's basketball tournament
ASUN men's basketball tournament
Basketball competitions in Nashville, Tennessee
College sports tournaments in Tennessee